The 1942 San Francisco State States football team represented San Francisco State College—now known as San Francisco State University—as an independent during the 1942 college football season. San Francisco State was led by first-year head coach Ray Kaufman for the first four games of the season. When he was called into the military, Dan Farmer, who had served as co-head coach from 1935 to 1938, took over the team for the final two games of the season. The Gaters finished the season with an overall record of 0–6 and were outscored by their opponents 156 to 12. They played home games at a new stadium in San Francisco, which was later named Cox Stadium. San Francisco State did not field another team until 1945.

Schedule

Notes

References

San Francisco State
San Francisco State Gators football seasons
College football winless seasons
San Francisco State Gaters football